The People's National Party (PNP) was the ruling party in Ghana during the Third Republic (1979-1981).

All political parties in Ghana were disbanded following the January 1972 military coup led by Col. Ignatius Kutu Acheampong. When political activities resumed in 1979, there were five parties contesting the elections. The PNP claimed to represent the Nkrumah heritage.

In elections held on 18 June 1979, PNP presidential candidate Hilla Limann won 35.3% of the vote and the party won 71 of 140 seats in the National Assembly. Limann won 62% of the vote in a 9 July run-off against Victor Owusu of the Popular Front Party (PFP). He took office as President of Ghana on 24 September 1979.

1979 establishments in Ghana
1981 disestablishments in Ghana
Defunct political parties in Ghana
Nkrumaist political parties
Pan-Africanism in Ghana
Pan-Africanist political parties in Africa
Political parties disestablished in 1981
Political parties established in 1979
Socialist parties in Ghana